Ualefi Rodrigues dos Reis (born 26 January 1994) is a Brazilian footballer who currently plays for Chattanooga Red Wolves in USL League One.

Career
Ualefi was with Corinthians from 2007 until 2013, also spending time on loan with Flamengo's academy side in 2013. He joined United Soccer League side Swope Park Rangers on 11 January 2016.

After a season in Brazil with Barretos, where he tallied 9 assists in 18 appearances, Ualefi returned to the United States on 13 December 2018, signing with USL League One side Chattanooga Red Wolves ahead of their inaugural season in 2019.

References

External links
 
 KC bio

1994 births
Living people
Brazilian footballers
Brazilian expatriate footballers
Sporting Kansas City II players
Chattanooga Red Wolves SC players
Association football midfielders
Expatriate soccer players in the United States
USL Championship players
USL League One players
Footballers from São Paulo